The Syriac Catholic Archeparchy of Al Hasakah-Nisibi(s) or of Al Hasakeh-Nisibi(s) (in French Hassaké–Nisibi) (informally Al-Hasakah–Nisibi(s) of the Syriacs) is a non-metropolitan archeparchy (Eastern Catholic archdiocese) of the Syriac Catholic Church (sui iuris, Syro-Oriental Rite in Syriac language) in Syria.

It is directly dependent on the Syriac Catholic Patriarch of Antioch and the Roman Congregation for the Oriental Churches), not part of any ecclesiastical province.

The cathedral of the Assumption of Mary in Al-Hasakah is its archiepiscopal see.

History 
Established on 17 July 1957 as Eparchy of Al-Hasakah (Diocese), on Syriac territory previously without proper Ordinary for the particular church sui iuris.

Promoted on 3 December 1964 as Archdiocese of Al-Hasakah–Nisibi(s) (Archdiocese), adopting as honorary second title Nisibi(s), a grand old, suppressed Metropolitan see which has titular archbishopric successor sees in four other Catholic rites but never was a Syriac Catholic diocese.

Episcopal ordinaries
(all West Syriac Rite)

Eparch of Al Hasakah
 Jean Karroum (1959.02.21 – 1964.12.03 see below)

Archeparchs of Al Hasakah
 Jean Karroum (see above 1964.12.03 – death 1967.03.22)
 Jacques Michel Djarwé (1967.07.18 – death 1981.09.08)
 Jacques Georges Habib Hafouri (1982.03.18 – retired 1996.06.28)
 Jacques Behnan Hindo (1996.06.29 – retired 2019.07.12)
 Joseph Abdel-Jalil Chami (since 2022.05.12)

References

External links 
 GCatholic, with incumbent biography links
 Catholic Hierarchy Archeparchy of Hassaké-Nisibi (Syrian)

Syriac Catholic dioceses
Eastern Catholicism in Syria